Harimau Cave or Tiger Cave is a limestone cavern in the Indonesian island of Sumatra where the island's first known rock art has been discovered. The cave also held 66 skeletons of farmers from 3,000 years ago.

Archaeology

The archaeological researcher Truman Simanjuntak in Indonesia has discovered the first known examples of rock art and the remains of 66 people as well as the bones of pigs, dogs and chickens, dated to 3,000 years BP, in a cave called  ('Tiger Cave') in Sumatra. Tools were manufactured on the same site. The number of skeletons is the largest so far found in a single cave in Indonesia.

References

Landforms of Sumatra
Caves of Indonesia